Events in the year 1956 

in the Republic of India.

Incumbents
 President of India – Rajendra Prasad
 Prime Minister of India – Jawaharlal Nehru
 Vice President of India – Sarvepalli Radhakrishnan
 Chief Justice of India – Bijan Kumar Mukherjea (until 31 Jan.), Sudhi Ranjan Das (starting 1 Feb.)

Governors
 Andhra Pradesh – Chandulal Madhavlal Trivedi
 Assam – Jairamdas Daulatram (until 15 May), Saiyid Fazal Ali (starting 15 May)
 Bihar – R. R. Diwakar (until 5 July), Zakir Hussain (starting 5 July)
 Karnataka – Jayachamarajendra Wadiyar (starting 1 November)
 Kerala – Burgula Ramakrishna Rao (starting 22 November)
 Madhya Pradesh – Pattabhi Sitaramayya
 Maharashtra – Harekrushna Mahatab (until 14 October), Sri Prakasa (starting 10 December)
 Odisha – P. S. Kumaraswamy Raja (until 11 September), Bhim Sen Sachar (starting 11 September)
 Punjab – Chandeshwar Prasad Narayan Singh 
 Rajasthan – Maharaj Man Singh II (until 31 October), Gurumukh Nihal Singh (starting 31 October)
 Uttar Pradesh – Kanhaiyalal Maneklal Munshi 
 West Bengal – 
 until 8 August: Harendra Coomar Mookerjee
 8 August-3 November: Phani Bhusan Chakravartti
 starting 3 November: Padmaja Naidu

Events
 National income - 133,139 million
 8 March – M. Ananthasayanam Ayyangar handles the charge as Lok Sabha Speaker.
 20 March – Sardar Hukam Singh handles the charge as Lok Sabha Deputy Speaker.
 21 July – The 6.1  Anjar earthquake shook Gujarat with a maximum Mercalli intensity of IX (Violent), killing 115 and injuring 254.
 1 September – LIC of India formed
 14 October – Dr. B. R. Ambedkar, Indian Untouchable leader, converts to Buddhism along with 385,000 followers. See Neo-Buddhism.
 Gentlemen's agreement of Andhra Pradesh (1956) signed

Law
 1 November – The States Reorganisation Act of India reformed the boundaries and names of Indian states.

Arts and literature
15 October – Kerala Sahithya Academy, Academy for Malayalam literature, is inaugurated by Chithira Thirunal Balarama Varma, the former king of Travancore.
List of Bollywood films of 1956

Births

January to June
1 February – Brahmanandam, comedian-actor.
6 April – Dilip Vengsarkar, cricketer.
4 May – Kunal Basu, novelist.
6 May – Sujata Bhatt, poet.
13 May – Sri Sri Ravi Shankar, spiritual and humanitarian leader.
31 May _ Manohara Rso Kodavoor.
2 June  Mani Ratnam, film director.

July to December
14 July – Tanikella Bharani, playwright, script writer and actor.
19 July – Rajendra Prasad, actor.
29 July – Chitra Banerjee Divakaruni, author and poet.
17 August – Anil Aggrawal, professor of forensic medicine.
19 October – Sunny Deol, actor.
25 November – Kristappa Nimmala, politician and member of parliament from Hindupur.
24 December – Anil Kapoor, actor and producer.
25 December  Prabhu, actor.

Deaths
6 December – B. R. Ambedkar, nationalist, jurist, Dalit political leader and a Buddhist revivalist (born 1891).

See also 
 List of Bollywood films of 1956

 
India
Years of the 20th century in India